Spiro is a British instrumental musical group based in Bristol, England, consisting of Jane Harbour (violin, viola) Alex Vann (mandolin) Jason Sparkes (piano accordion) and Jon Hunt (guitar). To date they have released four albums on the UK label Real World Records.

History
The band was formed in 1993 by violinist and composer Jane Harbour, whose classical and electronica influences met with the punk influences of Vann and Hunt.  Their early experiments centred around reworking traditional folk tunes, particularly those of the North of England, but Harbour's growing fascination with minimalist systems began to impact on the group and were evident by the time of the independently released Pole Star (1997), which fused both influences. The album was critically well received, and the band continued to play live, including writing and performing for theatre. However no further albums were released until the BBC's use of several Pole Star tracks brought them to the attention of manager Alan James and Real World Records, for whom they have recorded three further studio albums, Lightbox (2009), Kaleidophonica (2012) and Welcome Joy and Welcome Sorrow (2015). The latter two in particular largely feature original melodies and more intricate composition. Real World also re-released Pole Star (2014), a vinyl-only compilation album Repeater (2016) and a mini-album, The Vapourer (2013), with live recordings by the group and Moog versions of two of their compositions by Portishead's Adrian Utley.  The band have toured internationally, and in 2016 received nominations for the BBC Folk Awards and Songlines Awards.

Members
Jane Harbour (violin, viola; 1993 to present)
Alex Vann (mandolin; 1993 to present)
Jason Sparkes (accordion; 1993 to present)
Jon Hunt (acoustic guitar; 1993 to present)

Recordings
Lost in Fishponds (recorded as 'The Famous Five') (CD, Uncle, 1994)
Pole Star (Uncle, 1997)
Lightbox (Real World Records, 2009)
Kaleidophonica (Real World Records, 2012)
The Vapourer (with Adrian Utley, Real World Records, 2013)
Welcome Joy and Welcome Sorrow (Real World Records, 2015)
Repeater (Real World Records, 2016)

References

External links
Tassell, Nigel. Spiro. spiromusic.com/about.html. Accessed 2009-10-17.
Spiro. Real World Records website. Accessed 2009-10-17.
Spiro WOMAD website. Accessed 2009-10-17.
Review of Lightbox by Robin Denselow. The Guardian, 19 June 2009.
Review of Kaleidophonica by Colin Irwin. BBC website, 2012.
Review of Kaleidophonica by Robin Denselow. The Guardian, 16 February 2012.

Musical groups from Bristol
British instrumental musical groups
Musical groups established in 1993
Real World Records artists